Calumma fallax, the  deceptive chameleon or short-nosed deceptive chameleon is a species of chameleon endemic to eastern Madagascar, where its type locality is the Ikongo forest. It was first described by François Mocquard in 1900 as Chamaeleon fallax, and it was first recognized as Calumma fallax in 1986.

Distribution and habitat
Calumma fallax is endemic to eastern Madagascar, and has a type locality of the Ikongo forest, Madagascar. The International Union for Conservation of Nature have classed this species as "data deficient", as not enough information on this species is available to correctly classify it. The population of this species is unknown and no population trend is known. It is found in an area where the habitat is affected by the slash-and-burn agricultural method, bushfires, and logging. Calumma fallax is used in the pet industry and is sometimes domesticated.

Taxonomy
It was first described in 1900 by Mocquard as Chamaeleon fallax, and accepted as valid by Werner 11 years later under the same name. In 1986, Klaver and  moved it to the genus Calumma. This combination has been accepted in later studies.

Description

References

fallax
Reptiles of Madagascar
Endemic fauna of Madagascar
Taxa named by François Mocquard
Reptiles described in 1900